Parchhaiyan may refer to:
 Parchhaiyan (film), a Hindi language film of 1972, starring Vinod Khanna and Bindu
 Parchhaiyan (Indian TV series), a 2002 Hindi language drama-series
 Parchaiyan (Pakistani TV series), an Urdu language Pakistani television series